Zhangzhou Tan Co. Ltd. trading as TAN CO. is a food company based in Zhangzhou, Fujian province, China.  The company started functioning in 1994, as a comprehensive service provider, especially dedicating to the development & research for canned foodstuff, brand building, the sharing of export information, resources reassignment.

Market Performance

1.	The No.2 canned foodstuff for consumption exporter in China, accounting for 2.5% of total export volume of China. Annual export volume reaches $5,5000 ton, export amount as $60 million, always has been the Top 10 canned foodstuff exporter for the past 10 years.

2.	Canned mushroom export volume has been the NO.1 for the past 5 consecutive years, accounting for 12.5% of total export volume of China. Canned sweet corn export volume has been the NO. 1 for the past 8 consecutive years, canned lychee export volume has been the NO. 1 for the past 7 consecutive years, canned lychee export volume has been China Top 3 for the past 6 consecutive years, and among which canned lychee sales volume amounts Top 1 the whole worldwide, accounting for 17% of total export volume worldwide.

3.	In partnership with 500 long-standing partners in 126 countries

4.	 To drive impetus to about 20,000 farmer households, namely 5,0000 farmers to cultivate agricultural and sideline products, which provides more job opportunities for more than 2,500 industrial workers.

5.	Assume that each person annual consumption for canned food is 10 Kilo, globally there are about 5 million people consuming canned foodstuff supplied by TAN CO.;

6.	TAN's private brand has applied for registration in 142 countries; and has got approval in 27 countries; TAN's privately branded canned items export volume annual growth rate reaches 15%.

Company Qualifications

1.	Qualified by BRC, HACCP, Halal, Kosher

2.	Accredited by ISO 9001:2008 Standard Quality Management Certification System

a)	by ISO14001:2004 Standard Environmental Management Certification System

b)	by OHSAS18001: 2007 Standard Occupation Health and Safety management system

3.	“AA Grade (highest) Enterprise” accredited by General Administration of Customs; globally also known as AEO enterprise (Authorized Economic Operator)

4.	Products can meet Halal & Kosher production standards.

5.	Director of “China Chamber of Commerce of Import & Export of Foodstuff, Native Produce and Animal by –Products”;

6.	Vice Chairman of “Chamber of Commerce of FUJIAN Agricultural Products Export Base”

7.	Refined Enterprise of “Cultivating and Developing the International well-known branded Enterprises in Fujian Province”;

8.	Holder of “Renowned Trademark in Fujian Province” for the past 9 consecutive years

9.	“AAA Grade Credit Enterprise” ---- certified by China Chamber of Commerce of Import & Export of Foodstuff, Native Produce and Animal by –products

10.	Leading Enterprises of Agricultural Industrialization.

References

Trading companies of China
Food and drink companies of China
Companies based in Fujian
Chinese companies established in 1994